Bulbophyllum apetalum is a species of plant in the family Orchidaceae. It is found in West Tropical Africa to Uganda. It is a pseudobulb epiphyte, and its natural habitat includes tropical rainforests, mangrove swamps, and lowland forests. It was formerly the type species of the genus Genyorchis, which is now synonymous with Bulbophyllum.

References

apetalum
Plants described in 1862